Friend or Foe? is the debut and only studio album by California ska punk band the Forces of Evil, side project of fellow ska punk band Reel Big Fish. The last track, Fight, was the theme song at the 2003 Ska summit.

Track listing
"Angry Anthem"
"Go To Hell" (Suburban Rhythm Cover)
"My Life"
"Dance the Night Away" (Van Halen Cover)
"Vague Love Song"
"Hey! Woo! Yeah!"
"Mistake"
"Worst Day"
"Maybe I'm Wrong"
"Independent"
"Fight"

References

2003 albums